Daisy Hill may refer to:

Places
 Daisy Hill, Indiana, U.S.
 Daisy Hill, Queensland, Australia
 Daisy Hill, Victoria, Australia
 Daisy Hill, Westhoughton, Greater Manchester, England
Daisy Hill railway station

Other uses
 Daisy Hill F.C., an English football club 
 Daisy Hill Hospital, in Newry, Northern Ireland
 Daisy Hill Puppy Farm, fictional character Snoopy's birthplace

See also

Daisy (disambiguation)